A Wolf at the Door is a 2013 Brazilian drama thriller film written and directed by Fernando Coimbra. The film follows the story of Sylvia and Bernardo, the parents of a kidnapped girl, and Rosa, Bernardo's lover, who is suspected for the kidnapping. The film was based on a real life crime that occurred in the 60s where a woman called Neyde Maria Maia Lopes ("The Beast of Penha") kidnapped and killed 4-year- old Tania Maria Coelho de Araujo ("Taninha").
It received the Horizontes Latinos award at the 61st edition of the San Sebastián International Film Festival.

Plot
A mother and housewife named Sylvia goes to pick up her daughter Clara at school, and finds her missing. She is told by the teacher that she received a phone call from someone who claimed to be her, saying that she was sick and that a neighbor would come pick her up instead.

At the police station, Sylvia, her husband Bernardo, and the teacher are questioned for possible clues about who could have taken the girl. Bernardo reveals that he strongly suspects it was the work of a woman named Rosa, with whom he'd been carrying an affair for some time. Rosa is taken in for questioning. At first, she is reluctant to speak, and tells the police that she was blackmailed into taking the girl at the behest of a woman named Bete, whose husband was supposedly involved in an affair with Sylvia. This is exposed as a lie by the police after an investigation of the neighborhood reveals that no such woman exists, and after the police officer threatens her, Rosa confesses everything.

Rosa and Bernardo met a train station after the latter saw on her the train and followed her. Their affair begins passionately, but Rosa becomes upset when she discovers that Bernardo lied to her about being married and having a family. She tells him that she does not mind being his lover for the meantime, but begins to visit his wife and child, befriending her by pretending to be a mutual acquaintance of an old friend and presenting his daughter with gifts. Upon being told about this by his wife, Bernardo becomes enraged and fights with Rosa, abusing her and telling her never to seek out his family again. Rosa ignores this request, and tries to get back at him by paying a woman at a bar to phone him, pretending to be the wife of Sylvia's lover to try and sabotage their relationship. She also discovers that Bernardo has been rekindling his relationship with Sylvia anyway, and that it is likely that their affair is at its end.

During an argument about the future of their relationship, Rosa reveals that her period is late. Rosa complies with Bernardo's request to have a pregnancy test, which turns out positive. She tells Bernardo that he can resume his life without regard for what becomes of her, but that she is having the child no matter what. Some time later, Bernardo tricks Rosa into visiting a practitioner acquaintance of his, who drugs Rosa and performs an abortion against her will.

Devastated and unstable, Rosa tries to arrange one last meeting with Bernardo, but is rebuffed. She picks up Clara at school, and eventually takes her to an abandoned lot, where she pulls out a pistol from her purse, kills the child, and burns her corpse with flammable liquid. The film ends with a voiceover from the police officer describing Rosa's statement about the matter: she feels no remorse, and understands the full weight of her actions. She has no desire for an attorney, does not care about what will happen to her, and does not wish for anyone's forgiveness.

Cast
 Leandra Leal as Rosa
 Milhem Cortaz as Bernardo
 Fabiula Nascimento as Sylvia
 Juliano Cazarré as Police officer
 Thalita Carauta as Bete
 Paulo Tiefenthaler
 Tamara Taxman

References

External links
 
 
 

2013 films
Brazilian thriller drama films
Films shot in Rio de Janeiro (city)
2013 thriller drama films
2013 drama films
2010s Portuguese-language films